Annick Geille is a French writer and journalist. She won the prix du premier roman in 1981 for Portrait d'un amour coupable and prix Alfred-Née of the Académie française in 1984 for Une femme amoureuse. With Robert Doisneau, she is also cofounder of the magazine Femme.

She had a long-term affair with Françoise Sagan, after Geille approached Sagan about an article for the magazine that she edited, French Playboy.

As of 2021, she is a member of the jury of the Prix Jean-Freustié.

Works 
1978: Le Nouvel homme, JC Lattès
1981: Portrait d'un amour coupable, Grasset
1984: Une femme amoureuse, Grasset
1986: La Voyageuse du soir, Gallimard
1990: Les Roses électriques, Flammarion
1999: Une époque en or, éditions Mazarine
2002: Le Diable au cœur, Denoël
2005: Femme en voie de disparition, Denoël
2007: Un amour de Sagan, 
2011: Pour lui, Fayard

References

External links 
 J'ai aimé une star: Françoise Sagan, par Annick Geille on Gala
 Annick Geille : Le parti-pris du romancier Interview
 Annick Geille J’ai sauvé ma thyroïde on Paris Match
 Quand la mer tient les personnages d'Annick Geille à flot on L'Express

French women writers
French women journalists
20th-century French journalists
21st-century French journalists
20th-century French writers
21st-century French writers
Prix du premier roman winners
Living people
Year of birth missing (living people)
20th-century French women
21st-century French women